Katja Nyberg may refer to:

 Katja Nyberg (born 1979), Norwegian handball player.
 Katja Nyberg (politician)  Swedish politician.